During the 1896–97 English football season, Brentford competed in the London League Second Division. The club finished as runners-up to gain promotion to the First Division.

Season summary 

During the 1896 off-season, Brentford was elected into the Second Division of the newly-formed London League. 1896–97 marked the club's first full season of competitive league play since 1892–93, when it finished as champions of the West London Alliance. Long-serving half back Jimmy Ray and outside left Tommy Stevenson were released and transferred in were forwards Oakey Field, Harold Hudson, J. Wade and left half Billy Smith.

Despite a failure to win either the London Senior Cup, Middlesex Senior Cup or the West Middlesex Cup, Brentford took the London League Second Division by storm, losing just one match all season to finish as runners-up to champions Bromley and gain promotion to the First Division. Attendances at Shotter's Field were rarely below 1,500 and forward Oakey Field and captain Arthur Charlton scored many of the team's goals.

League table

Results
Brentford's goal tally listed first.

Legend

London League Second Division

London Senior Cup

Middlesex Senior Cup

West Middlesex Cup

 Source: 100 Years of Brentford

Playing squad 

 Player of unknown position: Batchelor
 Source: 100 Years of Brentford

Statistics

Management

Summary

Notes

References 

Brentford F.C. seasons
Brentford